This was the first edition of the event.

Myneni and Singh won the title, defeating Sanchai Ratiwatana and Sonchat Ratiwatana in the final, 7–6(7–5), 6–4.

Seeds

Draw

Draw

References 
 Draw

ONGC-GAIL Delhi Open - Men's Doubles
ONGC-GAIL Delhi Open - Men's Doubles